Jeanette Christine Ullyett (born 2 August 1986) in Standerton, South Africa. She is a former New Zealand cricketer who played 39 State League matches for the Northern Districts Spirit between 2003 and 2007.  A right-handed batsman and wicket-keeper, she averaged 6.13 across her career.

References

1986 births
Living people
New Zealand women cricketers
Northern Districts women cricketers